Lachnaia variolosa is a species of leaf beetles from the subfamily Cryptocephalinae that can be found in Algeria, Morocco and southern Spain.

References

Clytrini
Beetles described in 1767
Taxa named by Carl Linnaeus